Kanona is an unincorporated community in Decatur County, Kansas, United States.

History
A post office was opened in Kanona in 1881, and remained in operation until it was discontinued in 1955. The post office was called Altory until 1887.

Education
The community is served by Oberlin USD 294 public school district.

References

Further reading

External links
 Decatur County maps: Current, Historic, KDOT

Unincorporated communities in Decatur County, Kansas
Unincorporated communities in Kansas